Douglas Rimmer (29 April 1927 - 10 September 2004) was an economist and historian focusing on post-colonial West Africa. He first taught at the University College of the Gold Coast (now the University of Ghana at Legon) and was a founding member of the Centre of West African Studies at Birmingham University in 1963, where he became Director in 1983. Rimmer served the Royal African Society (RAS) for twenty years in various roles such as President (1986-1988). In 2001 he received the RAS/ASAUK Distinguished Africanist Award.

Publications
Books Rimmer authored or edited include:
 Macromancy: The Ideology Of 'Development Economics'''. London, Institute of Economic Affairs, 1973. Series: Hobart paper, 55 
 Nigeria Since 1970: A Political And Economic Outline, with A.H.M. Kirk-Greene. New York : Africana Pub. Co., 1981
 Social science research methods : an African handbook, with Margaret Peil and Peter K. Mitchell. London : Hodder and Stoughton, [1982]
 The Economies of West Africa, New York : St. Martin's Press, 1984
 Rural Transformation In Tropical Africa, Athens : Ohio University Press, 1988
 Action In Africa: The Experience Of People Involved In Government, Business & Aid, London : Royal African Society in association with James Currey. Heinemann, Portsmouth, N.H., 1991
 Africa 30 years on, London : Royal African Society in association with James Currey. Heinemann, Portsmouth, N.H., 1991
 Staying Poor: Ghana's Political Economy, 1950-1990, Oxford ; New York : Pergamon Press for the World Bank, 1992
 The British Intellectual Engagement With Africa In The Twentieth Century'', with A.H.M. Kirk-Greene; Royal African Society. New York : St. Martin's Press, 2000.

References

1927 births
2004 deaths
Academics of the University of Birmingham
British historians
Historians of Africa
Historians of Ghana
Historians of Nigeria
Academic staff of the University of Ghana